Jequetepeque District is one of five districts of the province Pacasmayo in Peru.

References